Alexander Crawford may refer to:

Alexander Crawford (cricketer) (1891–1916), English cricketer
Alexander Crawford (sailor) (1842–1886), American sailor
Alexander Hunter Crawford (1865–1945), Scottish businessman

See Also
Alex Crawford (born 1962), British journalist